Mumbai Maersk is a container ship of the Maersk Triple E class. The ship has a capacity of 20,568 TEUs and belongs to Maersk Line. Mumbai Maersk can carry over 18,000 twenty-foot (33 cbm) equivalent containers.

Havarie
No injuries were reported among the 30 people on board, no fuel leak sighted and the entrance to the port was not obstructed. The Mumbai Maersk was on its way from Rotterdam in the Weser estuary to Bremerhaven. The German Central command for maritime emergencies (Havariekommando) dispatched tugboats and the multi-purpose ships  and Mellum to the distressed vessel. A first attempt to tow the ship into deeper water on the morning of February 3, 2022 by the two multi-purpose vessels and five tugs failed. CCME deployed a number of additional tugs to make a second attempt.

See also 
 , the class preceding the Triple E

References

Container ships
Ships of the Maersk Line
2018 ships